Juha Pirinen (born 22 October 1991) is a Finnish professional footballer who plays as a left-back or a centre-back for Greek Super League club Volos.

Club career
Pirinen has played for Finnish Veikkausliiga club Tampere United and then moved back to his boyhood club FC Haka in January 2011. He played in Haka for three seasons, after which he moved to MYPA. Since MYPA folded in 2015, he played for RoPS. In 2017, he moved to HJK Helsinki.

Honours
HJK
 Veikkausliiga: 2017
Individual
 Veikkausliiga Defender of the Year: 2017
 Veikkausliiga Team of the Year: 2017

International career
Pirinen made his international debut for Finland on 10 January 2016 against Sweden.

References

External links
 

1991 births
Living people
People from Valkeakoski
Finnish footballers
Finland under-21 international footballers
Finland international footballers
Association football defenders
Association football midfielders
FC Haka players
Tampere United players
Myllykosken Pallo −47 players
Rovaniemen Palloseura players
Helsingin Jalkapalloklubi players
Tromsø IL players
AS Trenčín players
Volos N.F.C. players
Veikkausliiga players
Ykkönen players
Eliteserien players
Slovak Super Liga players
Super League Greece players
Finnish expatriate footballers
Expatriate footballers in Norway
Expatriate footballers in Slovakia
Expatriate footballers in Greece
Finnish expatriate sportspeople in Norway
Finnish expatriate sportspeople in Slovakia
Finnish expatriate sportspeople in Greece
Sportspeople from Pirkanmaa